Robert Stephen "Rob" Silberman is an American businessman and former United States Assistant Secretary of the Army (Manpower and Reserve Affairs) from 1992 to 1993. He was previously assistant to the chief executive officer of International Paper from 1993 to 1995 and CEO of Strayer Education, Inc. from 2001 to 2013. Silberman was named executive chairman of the board of Strayer Education Inc. in 2013. He is the son of judge Laurence Silberman.

Biography

Robert S. Silberman was born in Boston on October 30, 1957. He is a 1976 graduate of the Phillips Exeter Academy. Silberman was educated at Dartmouth College, receiving a B.A. in history in 1980. He received an M.A. in international economics from the  Johns Hopkins University School of Advanced International Studies in 1990.

From 1980 to 1984, Silberman served as a United States Naval Officer aboard . From 1985 to 1988, he worked in energy finance at The Henley Group, and at Ogden Corporation (the predecessor to Covanta Holding Corporation.)  In 1988 he entered Federal Government service as deputy administrator of the United States Maritime Administration in the United States Department of Transportation.

In 1990, he was appointed United States Deputy Assistant Secretary of the Navy. On June 15, 1992, President of the United States George H. W. Bush nominated Silberman to be United States Assistant Secretary of the Army (Manpower and Reserve Affairs).  After Senate confirmation, Silberman held this office from 1992 to 1993.

Silberman left government service in 1993, becoming assistant to the chief executive officer of International Paper.  He left for CalEnergy Company in 1995, where he served in a number of senior management roles, including as president and chief operating officer.  He left CalEnergy in 2000, and in March 2001 became chief executive officer of Strayer Education, Inc.  Additionally, since 2003 he has served as chairman of the board of Strayer.

In 2007, during his tenure at Strayer Education, Silberman was awarded Morningstar's CEO of the Year award. Other recipients of the award include Warren Buffett, Jamie Dimon, Charles Schwab and Herb Kelleher.

Silberman currently serves as a director of Strayer Education, Inc., of Covanta Holding Company, and of 21st Century Fox.  He also serves on the board of visitors of The Johns Hopkins University School of Advanced International Studies.  He is a member of the Council on Foreign Relations as well.

References

1957 births
Living people
Phillips Exeter Academy alumni
Dartmouth College alumni
Military personnel from Massachusetts
United States Navy officers
Paul H. Nitze School of Advanced International Studies alumni
Businesspeople from Boston
United States Department of Transportation officials
United States Army civilians
American chief operating officers
American chief executives